Zhuhai Taoyuan Middle School (colloquially known as 桃园中学, Táoyuán Zhōngxúe) is located in Xiangzhou, Zhuhai, Guangdong. It was a first-class middle school in Zhuhai and one of the Provincial Model Junior High Schools.

History 

Taoyuan Middle School was founded in 1983 as the junior high department of Zhuhai No.3 High School, on No.1 Taoyuan Rd, Xiangzhou.

In March 2008, the school got its independence and changed its name to "Zhuhai Taoyuan Middle School".

In 2011, the school was merged into Zhuhai Zijing Middle School as Taoyuan Rd Campus. Some students felt regret for the disappearance of the name of their school, while students' parents concerned if the two schools could achieve complete integration.

Campus facilities 

 A stadium with a 400-metre track, a standard football field. The stadium is used for the only test site of the PE Senior High School Entrance Examination in Xiangzhou.
 Teaching Buildings

References 

Schools in Guangdong